The William Faulkner – William Wisdom Creative Writing Competition is one of America's leading literary competitions and has been presenting awards in fiction, nonfiction and poetry since 1993. The competition is named after the Faulkner Society’s namesake, novelist William Faulkner, and William Wisdom of New Orleans, a literary scholar known for his collection of William Faulkner memorabilia. The event is sponsored by the Pirate's Alley Faulkner Society of New Orleans.  The contest draws celebrity literary judges, and regular participants have included John Biguenet, Stuart Dybek and Bret Lott.

The award has been instrumental in launching the careers of many emerging writers, including Moira Crone, Julia Glass, Jacob M. Appel, Lynn Stegner, and Rob Magnuson Smith.

Recent winners

Recent prize winners include:

2014 Winners
 Novel: Kitchens of the Great Midwest, J. Ryan Stradal, Los Angeles
 Narrative Non-Fiction Book: Shakespeare’s Royal Bastard, Lawrence Wells, Oxford, Mississippi
 Novella: Give Me You, Kay Sloan, Cincinnati
 Novel in Progress: All of the Lights, Maurice Ruffin, New Orleans

2013 Winners
 Novel: The Ambassador’s Wife Jennifer Steil, La Paz, Bolivia
 Narrative Non-Fiction Book: Paradise Misplaced (Published under Beginner’s Guide to Paradise) Alex Sheshunoff, Ojai, California 
 Novella: The Amazing Mr. Morality Jacob Appel, New York City
 Novel in Progress: Trespass Sharon Thatcher, Boise, Idaho

See also
 List of American literary awards
 List of literary awards

Notes

External links
Faulkner-Wisdom Competition
The Times-Picayune, New Orleans
 Faulkner-Wisdom 2014 Finalists

American fiction awards
Awards established in 1993